The Fairport Central School District is a public school district in New York State that serves approximately 5,800 students in most of the town of Perinton  and the village of Fairport in Monroe County, with about 1,200 employees and an operating budget of $127.0 million ($21,895 per student).

The student-teacher ratios are 18:1 for grades K–2, 22:1 for grades 3–5, 24:1 for grades 6–8, and 24:1 for grades 9–12.  The median teacher experience is 14 years and the median teacher salary is $63,339.

As of 2016, Brett Provenzano is the superintendent.

History
The predecessor for the district was a series of eleven district schools opened in the Town of Perinton in the 1810s through the 1830s.  From 1826 until 1872, the village was served by the district 9 school which was situated in two different buildings on East Church Street.  In 1872, the Fairport Classical and Union School opened on West Church Street.  Along with the Northside School (1886) on East Avenue and Fairport High School (1924) on West Avenue, it became part of system of schools that served the town population increasingly concentrated in the village.  In 1920, the board of education for the village schools hired its first superintendent.

Voters approved centralization of Perinton school districts 2 through 9 on April 30, 1951 and the centralized district began operating the following September.  At that point most of the district schools had closed and students attended one of the village schools (the Northside School on East Avenue, the Southside School on West Church Street, or Fairport High School on West Avenue).  The district opened the Johanna Perrin School on Potter Place in the Village in 1954, razing the Southside School (the former Fairport Classical and Union Free School) the following year.  In 1957, the district renamed the high school on West Avenue in honor of Martha A. Brown, and constructed a new high school, Minerva DeLand, in 1959.  The Brooks Hill Primary School followed in 1962 and the Jefferson Avenue Elementary School in 1966.  In 1965, the Martha Brown School moved to a new building on Ayrault Road.  In 1970, the district opened Dudley and Northside elementary schools as well as the current high school on Ayrault Road.  In the early 2000s the district briefly considered opening an additional elementary school in the hamlet of Egypt (to be named "White Brook" after the former district school 12), but could not secure enough funding from the state.
In 1999 the village of Fairport, the FCSD and Monroe #1 BOCES announced a collaboration to have public ch 12 used for more than government meetings and programs. A full-time staff was put together to accomplish this goal. As of 2013, this channel is no longer in use. Board of Education meetings may be viewed online at fairport.org

General information

The Fairport Central School District consists mostly of students from the Perinton/Fairport region, and is an avid participant in the Urban-Suburban program.

Central administration
Superintendent of Schools: Brett Provenzano

Assistant Superintendent of Human Resources & Labor Relations: Douglass Lauf

Assistant Superintendent of Business: Matthew Stevens

Director of Facilities: Aaron Smith

Director of Technology: Tom Devitt

Director of Humanities: Ellen Reed

Communications & Public Relations Specialist: Christina Lewis Gursslin

Director of Food Service: Michelle Resavage

Director of Math, Science, Technology: Kristen Larsen

Director of Transportation: Peter Lawrence

Director of Special Education: Dennis DesRosiers

Director of Student Services: Deborah Miles

Director of Staff Development: Kevin Henchen

Director of Special Areas: Pamula Ciranni

Director of Health, Physical Education & Athletics: Fritz Kilian

Student statistics

Board of education
The Board of Education (BOE) consists of seven members who serve rotating three-year terms. Elections, when necessary, are held each May to fill the seats of members whose terms have expired. These elections occur alongside voting on the School District's annual budget.

Arielle LaBarbera is currently the District Clerk.

Schools

Elementary schools

Brooks Hill Elementary School (K-5)
Principal: Meredith A. Klus

Asst. Principal: Stacie Miller

Lead Teacher: Jean Waldmiller
Brooks Hill School opened in 1962 as a primary school and is named after Lewis Brooks who once farmed the land on which it stands.
Dudley Elementary School (K-2)

Principal: Jamie Naple

Asst. Principal: Sarah Klosner

Dudley Elementary School opened in 1970 alongside Northside Elementary School.  It is named after longtime schoolboard member Robert A. Dudley.
Jefferson Avenue Elementary School (K-5)

Principal: Ryan Charno

Asst. Principal: Amy Busby

Lead Teacher: Jeannette Maloy

Jefferson Avenue Elementary School opened in 1966.
Northside Elementary School (3-5)

Principal: Erin Moretter

Asst. Principal: Jeremy Slack

Northside Elementary School opened in 1970 alongside Dudley Elementary School.  It is named after the original Northside School which was located on East Avenue in the village of Fairport.

Middle school

Johanna Perrin Middle School (6-8)
Principal: Patrick Grow

Asst. Principal: Rebecca Short
Perrin Middle School opened in 1954 as an elementary school and is named after the first white woman to settle in Perinton.
Martha Brown Middle School (6-8)
Principal: David Dunn

Asst. Principal: Ryan Clair
The Ayrault Road Martha Brown School opened in 1965 as a junior high school and is named after longtime Fairport teacher Martha A. Brown.  The original Martha Brown School was located in the former West Avenue School, which was renamed in her honor in 1959.

High schools

Minerva DeLand School (9)
Principal: Dominic Monacelli

Assistant Principal: Madison Shepard

DeLand High School opened in 1959 as the district's high school and is named after the longtime principal of the former Fairport High School on West Avenue.
Fairport High School (10-12)

Principal: Robert Clark

Assistant Principals:

Assistant Principal: Madison Shepard

Red House: Ryan Kuhn

White House: Lyndsey Keil

Blue House: Ashley Edwards

Fairport High School opened in 1970, partially replacing Minerva DeLand, which educates the district's ninth grade students.

School photographs

References

External links

New York State School Boards Association

Education in Monroe County, New York
Perinton, New York
School districts in New York (state)
School districts established in 1951